Alfred 'Alf' Norman Sandercock (1924-2007) was an Australian international lawn bowler.

Bowls career

World Bowls Championship
Sandercock won the pairs gold medal at the 1980 World Outdoor Bowls Championship in Frankston, Victoria with bowls partner Peter Rheuben. He also won a silver medal in the team event (Leonard Trophy).

National
Sandercock was the 1978 National Singles champion and represented Australia 73 times and South Australia 198 times.

Awards
He was inducted into the Australian Hall of Fame.

References

Australian male bowls players
Bowls World Champions
1924 births
2007 deaths